Yarwood is a surname. Notable people with the surname include:

Mike Yarwood (born 1941), English impressionist, comedian, and actor
Stephen Yarwood (born 1971), Australian politician

See also
Harwood (name)
Merton Yarwood Williams (1883–1974), Canadian geologist academic
Yearwood